Galabovo or Gulubovo is a  small mountainous village in the municipality of Belitsa, in Blagoevgrad Province, Bulgaria. It is located approximately 18 kilometers west-northwest from Belitsa and 85 kilometers southeast from Sofia. As of 2010 it had a population of 80 people, all of them Muslim of pomak origin . The village is connected by road with Lyutovo and Kraishte and from Kraishte with Belitsa and the national road system. Electricity is provided by aerial wires.

References

Villages in Blagoevgrad Province